Wells County is a county in the U.S. state of Indiana. As of the 2020 United States Census, the population was 28,180. The county seat (and only incorporated city) is Bluffton.

Wells County is included in the Fort Wayne Metropolitan Statistical Area and the Fort Wayne–Huntington–Auburn Combined Statistical Area.

History
The future state of Indiana was first regulated by passage of the Northwest Ordinance in 1787. The governing structure created by this act created Wayne County as part of Indiana Territory in 1796. As the Territory's lands began filling with settlers, other counties were organized, and in December 1816 the State of Indiana was admitted to the Union. The state legislature approved (on 7 February 1835) an omnibus bill which authorized the division of portions of Wayne County into thirteen counties. Wells was named for William A. Wells. It was assigned to Allen County for legislative and administrative affairs at first.

On 2 February 1837 an act was passed by the state, authorizing Wells County to be organized independent of Allen County, and specifying 1 May for the date of first meeting. However, that meeting did not take place, so an act dated 20 January 1838 further authorized the meeting of appointed commissioners to decide on a county seat. That vote was completed on 5 March 1838, selecting Bluffton.

Geography
The low rolling hills of Wells County have been deforested and are now completely devoted to agriculture and urban development. The Wabash River flows to the northwest, draining the central and upper part of the county, while the lower part is drained by the Salamonie River, also flowing to the northwest. The highest point on the terrain ( ASL) is an isolated rise on the county's south borderline with Jay County, one-half mile (0.8 km) east of the NE corner of Blackford County.

Adjacent counties

 Allen County - north
 Adams County - east
 Jay County - southeast
 Blackford County - south
 Grant County - west
 Huntington County - northwest

City and towns

 Bluffton (city/county seat)
 Markle (town; partly in Huntington County)
 Ossian (town)
 Poneto (town - named Worthington from 1871 to 1881)
 Uniondale (town)
 Vera Cruz (town)
 Zanesville (town; partly in Allen County)

Unincorporated communities

 Craigville
 Curryville
 Dillman
 Domestic
 Five Points
 Greenville
 Greenwood
 Jeff
 Keystone
 Kingsland
 Liberty Center
 McNatts
 Mount Zion
 Murray
 North Oaks
 Nottingham
 Petroleum
 Phenix
 Reiffsburg
 Riverside
 Rockford
 Tocsin
 Toll Gate Heights
 Travisville
 Wellsburg

Townships

 Chester
 Harrison
 Jackson
 Jefferson
 Lancaster
 Liberty
 Nottingham
 Rockcreek
 Union

Major highways

  Interstate 69
  U.S. Route 224
  State Road 1
  State Road 3
  State Road 116
  State Road 124
  State Road 201
  State Road 218
  State Road 301

Climate and weather

Government

The county government is a constitutional body, and is granted specific powers by the Constitution of Indiana, and by the Indiana Code.

County Council: The legislative branch of the county government; controls spending and revenue collection in the county. Representatives are elected to four-year terms from county districts. They set salaries, the annual budget, and special spending. The council has limited authority to impose local taxes, in the form of an income and property tax that is subject to state level approval, excise taxes, and service taxes.

Board of Commissioners: The executive body of the county; commissioners are elected county-wide to staggered four-year terms. One commissioner serves as president. The commissioners execute acts legislated by the council, collect revenue, and manage the county government.

Court: The county maintains a small claims court that handles civil cases. The judge on the court is elected to a term of four years. The judge is assisted by a constable who is also elected to a four-year term. In some cases, court decisions can be appealed to the state level circuit court.

County Officials: The county has other elected offices, including sheriff, coroner, auditor, treasurer, recorder, surveyor, and circuit court clerk. The officers are elected to four-year terms. Members elected to county government positions are required to declare party affiliations and to be residents of the county.

Demographics

2010 Census
As of the 2010 United States Census, there were 27,636 people, 10,780 households, and 7,684 families in the county. The racial makeup of the county was 97.3% white, 0.4% Asian, 0.3% American Indian, 0.3% black or African American, 0.8% from other races, and 0.9% from two or more races. Those of Hispanic or Latino origin made up 2.0% of the population. In terms of ancestry, 38.4% were German, 12.3% were English, 10.8% were Irish, and 10.3% were American.
Of the 10,780 households, 33.1% had children under the age of 18 living with them, 58.1% were married couples living together, 8.6% had a female householder with no husband present, 28.7% were non-families, and 24.8% of all households were made up of individuals. The average household size was 2.52 and the average family size was 3.00. The median age was 40.2 years.

The median income for a household in the county was $47,697 and the median income for a family was $56,885. Males had a median income of $41,871 versus $30,031 for females. The per capita income for the county was $23,169. About 6.2% of families and 8.0% of the population were below the poverty line, including 10.8% of those under age 18 and 3.6% of those age 65 or over.

Education
School districts include: Bluffton-Harrison Metropolitan School District, Northern Wells Community Schools, and Southern Wells Community Schools.

See also
 National Register of Historic Places listings in Wells County, Indiana

External links
 William Wells

References

 
Indiana counties
1837 establishments in Indiana
Populated places established in 1837
Fort Wayne, IN Metropolitan Statistical Area
Sundown towns in Indiana